Oliver James Younger (born 14 November 1999) is an English professional footballer who plays as a centre back for EFL League Two club Doncaster Rovers.

Career

Early career
He began his career with Burnley in 2007, aged 7 years old. He grew up a fan of the club and was a season ticket holder at the club for 15 years. He was in the same youth teams as England U21 international Dwight McNeil.

Burnley
On 10 February 2018, Younger alongside fellow youth teammate Dwight McNeil were included in Sean Dyche's first team squad for the Premier League game away to Swansea City. Younger signed his first professional contract with the club in April 2018, signing a 2 year deal.

St Patrick's Athletic loan
On 13 February 2020, the day before their first game of the season, it was announced that Younger had signed for League of Ireland Premier Division side St Patrick's Athletic on loan until 31 July. He made his debut in senior football in a 2–0 win away to Sligo Rovers in which Younger was sent off after receiving 2 yellow cards within 5 minutes of each other. His next appearance came against Cork City at Richmond Park and resulted in more bad luck for Younger as he was hospitalized after receiving 10 minutes of treatment on the pitch following an elbow to the jaw which saw him lose consciousness. This proved to be his last appearance for the club as the league was postponed due to the COVID-19 pandemic and did not resume until after Younger's loan spell at the club was up.

Sunderland
It was announced in September 2020 that Younger had signed for Sunderland, initially linking up with their under-23's side. He made his Sunderland first team debut on 10 November 2020, in a 2–1 loss to Fleetwood Town in the EFL Trophy. Younger made his league debut for the club on 6 March 2021, playing at right-back in a 2–0 win over Rochdale at the Stadium of Light. On the 14th March 2021, Younger won the first silverware of his senior career as he was an unused substitute in a 1–0 win over Tranmere Rovers in the 2021 EFL Trophy Final at Wembley Stadium, having made 3 appearances in the competition on the way to the final.

Doncaster Rovers
On 19 January 2022, Younger joined League One's bottom side Doncaster Rovers on an eighteen-month deal. He made 16 appearances for the club by the end of the season, as they were relegated to EFL League Two. Younger suffered a long term injury during pre-season ahead of the 2022–23 season, snapping his hamstring.

Career statistics

Honours
Sunderland
EFL Trophy: 2020–21

References

1999 births
Living people
English footballers
Footballers from North Yorkshire
Association football defenders
Burnley F.C. players
St Patrick's Athletic F.C. players
Sunderland A.F.C. players
Doncaster Rovers F.C. players
League of Ireland players
English Football League players
English expatriate footballers
Expatriate association footballers in the Republic of Ireland
English expatriate sportspeople in Ireland